Giuseppe Fella (born 11 August 1993) is an Italian professional footballer who plays as forward for  club Monopoli, on loan from Palermo.

Career 
Fella started playing football in Cittadella Youth Sector. In January 2013, he moved to Campobasso where he scored three goals in 16 appearances. In summer 2013, he moved to Serie D side Brindisi scoring five goals in 30 appearances. In 2014, Fella re-joined to play in Serie C for Melfi scoring five goals and five assists. Fella moved to Bassano in 2015 and in January 2016 he moved to Siena 1904 scoring no goals in both teams. In the summer 2016, Fella returned to Serie D joining Nocerina, making six goals. In 2017, Fella moved to Cavese making in the 2017–18 season, 13 goals leading his side to promotion play-offs which were won beating Taranto. On 3 August 2018, Serie C announced that Cavese would be promoted to Serie C. Fella made in the 2018–19 season, 11 goals in 30 appearances. In 2019, he moved to Monopoli and he scored 16 goals in 26 appearances in the 2019–20 season who was curtailed due to the COVID-19 pandemic in Italy. After this season, Salernitana bought him. However Salernitana loaned him to Avellino where he scored nine goals in 34 appearances. Fella was loaned to Palermo on 23 July 2021, with a conditional obligation to buy.

After Palermo won promotion to Serie B through playoff, Fella was signed permanently as part of an automatic buy clause. On 31 August 2022, he was loaned out to Serie C club Monopoli.

Career statistics

Club

References

General

Specific 

1991 births
Living people
A.S. Cittadella players
S.S.D. Città di Campobasso players
S.S.D. Città di Brindisi players
A.S. Melfi players
Bassano Virtus 55 S.T. players
A.C.N. Siena 1904 players
A.S.D. Nocerina 1910 players
Cavese 1919 players
S.S. Monopoli 1966 players
U.S. Salernitana 1919 players
U.S. Avellino 1912 players
Palermo F.C. players
Serie C players
Serie D players
Italian footballers
Association football forwards